"Galloping Gertie" is a 1975 saloon piano song by Sam Fonteyn. The song was featured in "Blackened Sponge" (season five, episode fourteen) of SpongeBob SquarePants.

It was used as the "Play me off, Johnny" music by the Vaudeville characters Johnny and Vern on Family Guy and appears in the episodes "Blind Ambition", "Perfect Castaway", "The Father, the Son and the Holy Fonz", "Deep Throats", "Saving Private Brian" and "Back to the Woods".

References

1975 songs
1970s instrumentals